The men's canoe sprint C-1 200 metres at the 2012 Olympic Games in London took place between 10 and 11 August at Eton Dorney. On 12 June 2019, the IOC stripped Jevgenij Shuklin of his silver medal. Silver and bronze medals were then reallocated in 2021.

Competition format

The competition comprised heats, semifinals, and a final.

Schedule

All times are British Summer Time (UTC+01:00)

Results

Heats
The six best placed boats in each heat qualify for the semifinals.

Heat 1

Heat 2

Heat 3

Heat 4

Semifinals
The fastest two canoeists in each semifinal qualify for the 'A' final alongside the two fastest third placed boats. The last third placed boat alongside, the fourth and fifth placed boats and the fastest sixth placed boat qualify for the 'B' final.

Semifinal 1

Semifinal 2

Semifinal 3

Finals

Final B

Final A

References

Canoeing at the 2012 Summer Olympics
Men's events at the 2012 Summer Olympics